William Wheatley (1816–1876) was an American stage actor. Other notable people of that name include:
 William of Wheatley, an English divine, schoolmaster and author
 William O. Wheatley Jr. (born ), an American television producer and executive